Arani or Aarani or Aran may refer to:

Places
 Arani, Bolivia, a city in Bolivia
 Arani Municipality, a municipality in Bolivia
 Arani Province, a province in Bolivia
 Arani, Tiruvannamalai District, a city in Tamil Nadu, India
 Arani, Chennai, a suburb of Chennai, Tiruvallur District, Tamil Nadu
 Arani River, in India

See also
 Arani (name)
 Arni (disambiguation)